Chirodropidae is a family of venomous box jellyfish within the class Cubozoa. Like other members of the order Chirodropida, they have branched pedalia (muscular bases at the corners of their cubic umbrella), in contrast to the unbranched pedalia of box jellyfish in the order Carybdeida. Each branch houses its own individual tentacle. Nematocyst composition and type can vary among individuals within this family based on body size and life stage. Like other box jellyfish, chirodropids can be found in coastal and shallow marine areas, but they have also been found to occur at benthic depths.

Genera
Chirodectes Gershwin, 2006
Chirodectes maculatus (Cornelius, Fenner & Hore, 2005)
Chirodropus Haeckel, 1880
Chirodropus gorilla Haeckel, 1880 
Chirodropus palmatus Haeckel, 1880
Chironex Southcott, 1956
Chironex fleckeri Southcott, 1956 
Chironex indrasaksajiae Sucharitakul, 2017 
Chironex yamaguchii Lewis & Bentlage, 2009

References

 
 Lewis, C. and B. Bentlage (2009). Clarifying the identity of the Japanese Habu-kurage, Chironex yamaguchii, sp nov (Cnidaria: Cubozoa: Chirodropida). Zootaxa 2030: 59–65

 
Chirodropida
Cnidarian families